Orta is an island in Aukra Municipality in Møre og Romsdal county, Norway. The  island lies midway between the islands of Harøya and Gossa in the Harøyfjorden. There are ferry connections from Orta to Sandøya and Finnøya (in Ålesund Municipality) and to Gossa (in Aukra Municipality).

On 1 January 2020, the island of Orta and the small surrounding islets were administratively transferred to the neighboring Aukra Municipality.  Prior to that time, they were part of the old Sandøy Municipality.

See also
List of islands of Norway

References

Aukra
Islands of Møre og Romsdal